Prakriti Manohari is a 1980 Indian Malayalam film,  directed by GS Panicker. The film stars Jagannatha Varma, Lisha and Sujath in lead roles.

Cast
Jagannatha Varma
Lisha
Sujath

References

External links
 

1980 films
1980s Malayalam-language films